Hartmut Graßl (born 18 March 1940) is a German climate scientist and a former director of the Max Planck Institute for Meteorology.

Born in Salzberg, near Berchtesgaden, Graßl studied physics and meteorology at the Ludwig Maximilian University of Munich, and earned his PhD in Munich in 1970. In 1981 he became professor of theoretical meteorology at the University of Kiel, and in 1984 he became director of the Institute of Physics at the GKSS Research Centre. In 1988 he became professor at the University of Hamburg and director of the Max Planck Institute for Meteorology. He retired in 2005.

Honours
 Scientific Member of the Max Planck Society, 1988
 , 1991
 Member of the Academia Europaea, 1994
 German Environmental Prize, 1998
 Great Cross of Merit of the Order of Merit of the Federal Republic of Germany, 2002
 Bavarian Order of Merit, 2008

References 

1940 births
Living people
German climatologists
Academic staff of the University of Hamburg
Members of Academia Europaea
Commanders Crosses of the Order of Merit of the Federal Republic of Germany
Ludwig Maximilian University of Munich alumni
Academic staff of the University of Kiel
Max Planck Institute directors